The Privacy Protection Act of 1980 is legislation passed in the United States that protects journalists and newsrooms from search by government officials.  The act protects "work products" and "documentary materials," which have been broadly interpreted. A subpoena must be ordered by the court to gain access to the information. The act stemmed in part from Zurcher v. Stanford Daily.

References 

1980 in law
United States federal legislation articles without infoboxes
United States federal privacy legislation